As Long As We Keep Moving is an album and film of a live studio session conducted by British indie rock band Maxïmo Park. It was released in March 2019 through their own Daylighting imprint as well as Cooking Vinyl. Paul Smith commented that one reason for creating the package was to capture the energy of the songs' live arrangements in contrast to the studio setting, as it had been a long time since their last official live film release. It also marks the departure of founding member and keyboardist Lukas Wooller, who left the band coinciding the release campaign.

Release
Originally planned for release on 22 February, the recording was released in March both as a standalone CD and as a 2-disc CD/DVD hardback book package with several pages of photographs with psychedelic treatments in keeping with the editing style of the video. The release was proceeded by a premiere of the film at Tyneside Cinema on 21 February, followed by a Q&A with the band. Pre-orders from the band's official store came with a bonus CD of three songs recorded in the soundcheck for the live session.

Track listing

Personnel
Maxïmo Park
 Paul Smith – vocals
 Duncan Lloyd – guitars
 Lukas Wooller – keyboards
 Tom English – drums
 Paul Rafferty – bass guitar (credited as 'Featuring Paul Rafferty', as Rafferty was not an official member of the band at the time of recording, although he featured on previous studio album Risk to Exist)

References

2019 albums
Maxïmo Park albums